Dixon-Leftwich-Murphy House, also known as the Leftwich House, is a historic home located at Greensboro, Guilford County, North Carolina. It was built between 1870 and 1875, and consists of an original two-story, three-bay Gothic Revival style main brick block; a brick addition; and a gabled two-story frame rear addition. It has Italianate style details, a complex hipped roof with steep cross gables, a brick front porch added about 1920, and an enclosed two-tier rear porch.

It was listed on the National Register of Historic Places in 1982.  It is located in the Fisher Park Historic District.

References

Houses on the National Register of Historic Places in North Carolina
Gothic Revival architecture in North Carolina
Italianate architecture in North Carolina
Houses completed in 1875
Houses in Greensboro, North Carolina
National Register of Historic Places in Guilford County, North Carolina
Historic district contributing properties in North Carolina